The Australian Champion Two Year Old is awarded annually to the two-year-old Thoroughbred horse whose performances in Australia are deemed to be the most impressive throughout each racing season.
It has been awarded at the conclusion of each racing season since 1994.

Other Australian Thoroughbred awards
Australian Champion Racehorse of the Year
Australian Champion Three Year Old
Australian Champion Sprinter
Australian Champion Middle Distance Racehorse
Australian Champion Stayer
Australian Champion Filly or Mare
Australian Champion International Performer
Australian Champion Jumper
Australian Champion Trainer

References

Australian Thoroughbred racing awards